Iron is the second studio album by Finnish folk metal band Ensiferum. It is the band's first album to feature keyboardist Meiju Enho. It is also their last album featuring Jari Mäenpää before he formed Wintersun the same year, as well as their final album to feature bassist Jukka-Pekka Miettinen and drummer Oliver Fokin.

Track listing

Credits

Band members
 Jari Mäenpää − vocals, guitars
 Markus Toivonen − guitars, backing vocals, shaman drum
 Meiju Enho − keyboards
 Jukka-Pekka Miettinen − bass
 Oliver Fokin − drums, percussion, bombo, tinja, tambourine

Session musicians
 Vesa Vigman − bouzouki, mandolin, saz, and dulcimer, saxophone
 Eveliina Kontio − kantele
 Kaisa Saari − female vocals on "Ferrum Aeternum" and "Tears", tenor and soprano, recorders and tin whistles

References

2004 albums
Ensiferum albums
Albums with cover art by Kristian Wåhlin
Albums produced by Flemming Rasmussen